Corporal Jackie was a baboon in the South African army during World War I. He was made their mascot when his owner was drafted into war, and would not leave Jackie at home. Jackie received various injuries during the war such as being shot in the shoulder and having his right leg blown off. Jackie was trained to salute when he saw a superior officer. After the war, Jackie was given the rank of corporal, and the Pretoria Citizens Service Medal, then he died a year later in a home fire.

Background

Jackie's human story started in the early half of the 1910s when South African Albert Marr found the baboon around his farm. He captured Jackie and began training him to be "a member of the family."

War

Jackie lived a few years in the Marr Farm before World War I broke out. Marr was drafted in 1915, and refused to leave Jackie at home. Marr's commanding officers, to the soldiers' surprise, acquiesced, so Jackie was made a mascot for the 3rd South African Infantry Regiment (Transvaal) and brought everywhere with them. Jackie was given an official-style uniform with a cap, a ration set, and his own paybook. Jackie would salute to superior officers and light soldiers' cigarettes. He would even stand at ease in the style of a trained soldier. Due to his heightened senses, Jackie was useful to sentries on duty at night. The baboon would be the first to know when an attack was coming or enemy soldiers were moving around nearby.

Jackie and Marr survived a battle where the casualty rate was 80 percent, in Delville Wood, early in the Somme Campaign.

When Marr was serving in Egypt he was shot in the shoulder at the Battle of Agagia, 26 February 1916, while Jackie was with him, licking the wound as they awaited help.

Jackie was given his own rations while with the army and ate them with his own knife and fork, as well as his own washing basin. When the regiment was drilled and marched, Jackie would be with them.

Jackie spent time in the trenches in France where he tried to build a wall around himself during extreme enemy fire, but a piece of shrapnel from an explosion flew over the wall hitting Jackie in the leg and arm. When stretcher bearers tried to take Jackie away he refused, desperate to finish his wall and hide. Doctors treated Jackie's wounds, but they decided his leg had to be amputated and were surprised that he even survived.

Jackie was awarded a medal of valor for the event of his injuries and promoted from private to corporal. After the war was over, Jackie was discharged with papers at the Maitland Dispersal Camp in Cape Town. Jackie was not the only baboon made part of the South African army, but he was the only baboon to achieve the rank of private or higher.

Return to South Africa

After the war, Marr brought Jackie back to South Africa, but the baboon died in a fire a year later in May 1921. Marr died, aged 84, in 1973.

See also
 List of individual monkeys

References

External links
15 Of The Bravest Military Animals To Ever Serve Their Country
Jackie; The South African Baboon soldier of World War I

In books
Weird War One
Page 32
Page 12
No page number, fiction, direct reference to Jackie the baboon of South Africa WW1
No page number "First baboon soldier" (first promoted to the soldier is the reality)
Page 65
No page number, quote, "and the baboon. m Jackie, a Chacma baboon, was probably the only monkey in history to become a corporal in the army"
Guinness Records 1975 pages 59-60
Page 120
Page 118
Page 338
Page 58
No page number, title, "JACKIE"
No page number, quote," Albert Marr, the owner, his baboon named "Jacko" or "Jackie". According to a correspondent in Home Front, July 1950, page 7"

1910s animal births
1921 animal deaths
Animal amputees
Army mascots
Deaths from fire
Individual animals in South Africa
Individual baboons
South African Army